Plácido de la Vega Daza y Colón de Portugal (1830–1878) was a General and Governor of the Mexican state Sinaloa.

Origins and ancestry 
He descended directly from Cristopher Columbus' great-great grandson, the Admiral and 3rd Duke of Veragua and Marquis of Jamaica, D. Nuno Alvares Pereira Colón de Portugal y Fernández de Córdoba, and his second wife, Luisa de Aragón y Zapata. From the 17th century to the 18th century his family was heir to the famous Majorat or " El Mayorazgo de la Colonas" established in Pontevedra, Spain by his ancestors D. Miguel Henríquez Flores and Dª. Jerónima de Vargas Machuca. In the mid 18th century, his family settled in the northern Mexican city of Culiacán, Sinaloa which was then New Spain, and became the major political and commercial influence of Northern Mexico. His family owned vast lands, valleys, and gold mines, but he did not sympathize with his family's ideology of repression of the poor. Although members of his family had previously held his position as Sinaloa governors, he prevented his relatives from having access to politics (with major consequences) when he became governor at the age of 29.

Plácido de la Vega was a native of El Fuerte de Montesclaros, Sinaloa, Mexico. Born to Francisco Xavier de la Vega y Esquer and María Dolores Daza, great-grandson of Baltasar Ignacio de la Vega Enríquez y Colón de Portugal (member of the family of the Dukes of Veragua) and Ana Irene de la Puente y Villegas). He was an idealist with strong temperament, and found in the military a career that best suited his intellectual and idealistic pursuits.

Political career

When President Benito Juárez led Mexico's resistance against the French Intervention, financial and military support from outside of Mexico was desperately sought after. In 1864, General Plácido de la Vega, by then a 3rd division central army General, was sent by Juárez on a secret mission to California, to meet with leading Mexican-American families of Contra Costa to seek support for the constitutional government of Mexico and the movement for independence. Seeking additional political influence, General Vega also became a vice-president of the Union Club of San Francisco. As an officer of the Union Club, he contributed both time and money working on Abraham Lincoln's 1864 re-election.

Brief timeline
19 August 1858: Plácido Vega proclaimed "El Plan de El Fuerte", in favor of the Constitution of 1857
4 June 1859: Plácido Vega is made governor of Sinaloa
December 1860: The oppressive Bishop Pedro Loza Pardavé is brought to justice by Plácido Vega.

See also
Capture of Mazatlán

External links
 http://www.debate.com.mx/eldebate/index.asp?
 http://omega.ilce.edu.mx:3000/sites/estados/libros/sinaloa/html/sinalo.html  	(Spanish. The best reference on the web about Plácido Vega)
 https://web.archive.org/web/20170516205242/http://mazatlandecimononico.com/ (Spanish. Plácido Vega as Sinaloa's Governor during French Intervention)
http://www.debate.com.mx/eldebate/Articulos/ArticuloGeneral.asp?idArt=10230265&IdCat=6087&Page=2
http://www.xenealoxia.org/linaxes/celebridades/1530-colon-pontevedra
http://www.cristobal-colon.com/2010/11/ramon-sobrino-buhigas/
http://www.debate.com.mx/eldebate/Articulos/ArticuloPrimera.asp?idArt=10281366&IdCat=6087&Page=2
http://ssh.org.mx/sitio/wp-content/uploads/2011/03/Realidad.pdf

1830 births
1878 deaths
People from Sinaloa
Mexican generals
Mexican people of Italian descent